Mammillaria petterssonii is a species of cactus in the genus Mammillaria, native to northeast and southwest Mexico. It has gained the Royal Horticultural Society's Award of Garden Merit.

References

petterssonii
Endemic flora of Mexico
Flora of Northeastern Mexico
Flora of Southwestern Mexico
Plants described in 1886